Pendik station is the main railway station in Pendik, Istanbul. Located between Hatboyu and Abdülhalik Renda Avenues in southeastern Pendik. TCDD Taşımacılık operates YHT trains to Ankara and Konya, via Eskişehir, along with daily regional trains to Adapazarı. The metro line M10 is currently under construction to make the link with Sabiha Gökçen Airport, which is located about 9km in the North.

History

Pendik station was originally opened in 1872 by the Ottoman government, as part of a railway from Constantinople (modern-day Istanbul) to İzmit. The railway was later taken over by the Ottoman Anatolian Railway (CFOA) in 1888 and extended to Konya and Ankara. In 1909, the railway began operating frequent train service from Haydarpaşa station to Pendik. The CFOA was nationalized in 1927 and in 1936, Pendik station was rebuilt and expanded by the Turkish State Railways. In 1969, the station was electrified and commuter rail service between Haydarpaşa and Gebze began servicing Pendik. The station was also a stop on all intercity trains running east from Istanbul. On 29 April 2012, all train service east of the station was suspended for the construction of the Istanbul-Ankara high-speed railway and the Marmaray commuter rail system. Commuter trains continued to operate from Haydarpaşa to Pendik until 19 February 2013 when all train service west of the station was suspended. Pendik station was rebuilt during its 17-month closure; the platforms were rebuilt and expanded to service four tracks, instead of three, and a new station mezzanine was constructed in the underpass. On 26 July 2014, Pendik station reopened, serving high-speed YHT trains to Ankara and Konya. Works on the rest of the Marmaray system was completed by March 12, 2019, when further intercity train service, along with commuter rail service, returned to Pendik station.

Station Layout
Pendik station has two island platforms and one side platform. Platform 1, served by tracks 1 and 2, are reserved for future Maramaray commuter service. Platforms 2, serving tracks 3 and 4, are for TCDD high-speed and regional trains.

References

External links
Pendik station information
Pendik station timetable
Pendik tren istasyonu (Turkish)
istanbul konya hızlı tren saatleri

Pendik
Railway stations in Istanbul Province
Railway stations opened in 1872
1872 establishments in the Ottoman Empire
High-speed railway stations in Turkey